A list of mountain ranges of Maricopa County, Arizona.

Alphabetical list
Belmont Mountains–Maricopa County
Big Horn Mountains (Arizona)–Maricopa County
Crater Range–Maricopa County
Eagletail Mountains–Maricopa County
Gila Bend Mountains–Maricopa County
Goldfield Mountains–Maricopa County
Harquahala Mountains–E. La Paz County -- (W. Maricopa County)
Hieroglyphic Mountains–Maricopa County -- (some in S. Yavapai County)
Maricopa Mountains–Maricopa County
Mazatzal Mountains–Southeast Yavapai County -- (and N. Maricopa, W. Gila County)
McDowell Mountains–Maricopa County
Painted Rock Mountains–Maricopa County
Phoenix Mountains–Maricopa County
Sand Tank Mountains–Maricopa County
Sierra Estrella–Maricopa County
Salt River Mountains–Maricopa County
South Mountains (Arizona)–Maricopa County
Usery Mountains–Maricopa County -- (See: Usery Mountain Recreation Area.)
Vulture Mountains–Maricopa County
White Tank Mountains–Maricopa County
Wickenburg Mountains–Southern Yavapai County -- (and N. Maricopa County)

See also
List of mountain ranges of the Sonoran Desert

Maricopa County, Arizona
Arizona, Maricopa County, List of mountain ranges of